Cychrini is a tribe of ground beetles in the family Carabidae. There are about 6 genera and more than 300 described species in Cychrini.

Genera
These six genera belong to the tribe Cychrini:
 Cychropsis Boileau, 1901 - China and the Indian subcontinent
 Cychrus Fabricius, 1794 - Holarctic
 Maoripamborus Brookes, 1944 - New Zealand
 Pamborus Latreille, 1812 - Australia
 Scaphinotus Dejean, 1826 - North America
 Sphaeroderus Dejean, 1826 - North America

References

Further reading

 

Carabidae